This is a list of best-selling albums by year in Italy. The Federation of the Italian Music Industry began publishing year-end lists for album sales in 2000. The charts are based on the cumulative total sales collected during the year from January to December.

The only albums by foreign artists to top the Italian year-end chart were 1 by The Beatles in 2000, and ÷ by Ed Sheeran in 2017. Vasco Rossi achieved five annual best-selling albums in Italy with the records Stupido hotel in 2001, Tracks in 2002, Buoni o cattivi in 2004, Vivere o niente in 2011 and Sono innocente in 2014. Other multiple toppers of the year-end chart were Eros Ramazzotti, whose albums 9 and e² were the best-selling records of 2003 and 2007, respectively, and Tiziano Ferro, which achieved the first position on the annual chart in 2009 with Alla mia età and in 2012 with L'amore è una cosa semplice. More recently, Luciano Ligabue had two annual best-selling albums in Italy, with Arrivederci, mostro! and Mondovisione being the best-selling album in 2010 and 2013, respectively, and Jovanotti achieved the same result with Safari (2008) and Lorenzo 2015 CC. (2015).

2000–2009

2010–2019

2020−present

Vinyl albums

{|class="wikitable plainrowheaders sortable"
|-
!style="width:50px;"|Year
!style="width:100px;"|Artist
!style="width:170px;"|Album
!style="width:100px;"|Nationality
|-
!scope="row"|2015
|David Gilmour
|Rattle That Lock
|United Kingdom
|-
!scope="row"|2016
|David Bowie
|Blackstar
|United Kingdom
|-
!scope="row"|2017
|Pink Floyd
|The Dark Side of the Moon
|United Kingdom
|-
!scope="row"|2018
|Pink Floyd
|The Dark Side of the Moon
|United Kingdom
|-
!scope="row"|2019
|Pink Floyd
|The Dark Side of the Moon
|United Kingdom
|-
!scope="row"|2020
|Pink Floyd
|The Dark Side of the Moon
|United Kingdom
|-
!scope="row"|2021
|Pink Floyd
|The Dark Side of the Moon
|United Kingdom
|-
!scope="row"|2022
|Harry Styles
|Harry's House
|United Kingdom
|-
|}

Notes
A  Vasco Rossi's Tracks spent five weeks atop the Italian Albums Chart in 2002 and four additional weeks at number one in 2003.
 B  Laura Pausini's Io canto spent six weeks atop the Italian Albums Chart in 2006 and two additional weeks at number one in 2007.
 C  Tiziano Ferro's Alla mia età spent two weeks atop the Italian Albums Chart in 2009, but it also reached number one in its debut week in 2008.
 D  Tiziano Ferro's L'amore è una cosa semplice spent three weeks atop the Italian Albums Chart in 2012, but it also reached number one for two weeks in 2011.
 E  Luciano Ligabue's Mondovisione spent five weeks atop the Italian Albums Chart in 2013 and two additional weeks at number one in 2014. 
 F  Mina & Celentano's Le migliori spent three weeks atop the Italian Albums Chart in 2016 and two additional weeks at number one in 2017.
 G  Persona by Marracash spent four weeks atop the Italian Albums Chart in 2020, but it also reached number one for two weeks in 2019.
 H  Taxi Driver'' by Rkomi spent four weeks atop the Italian Albums Chart in 2021, but it also reached number one for two weeks in 2022.

References

External links
 Official website of the Federation of the Italian Music Industry

Italian music-related lists
Italy